Taarzan: The Wonder Car, or simply called Taarzan, is a 2004 Indian Hindi-language supernatural action thriller film directed by Abbas–Mustan. The film stars Ajay Devgn, Vatsal Sheth and Ayesha Takia, while Farida Jalal, Pankaj Dheer, Sadashiv Amrapurkar, Amrish Puri,  Shakti Kapoor, Gulshan Grover and Mukesh Tiwari play supporting roles. Upon release, the film was a box office disaster. It is loosely based on the American film Christine (1983).

Ayesha Takia won the Filmfare Best Debut Award.

Plot
Automobile engineer Deven Chaudhary, who lives with his mother Suhasini and ten-year-old son Raj, builds a futuristic car with advanced features. He names this design as DC.

He also owns and maintains an older Morris Minor car that was handed down to him by his late father that he calls "Taarzan", based on the car's mirror ornament that resembles Edgar Rice Burroughs character Tarzan. Deven meets FourFox, a private company to discuss his design. FourFox executive Rakesh Kapoor and his partners Kailash, Anthony and Mahesh praise the design but disagree over royalties. However, they steal the design and registered it under their own name. This infuriates Deven and he files a complaint with the police. However, the police inspector who takes his case is secretly on Rakesh's payroll. He, along with Rakesh and his cronies, attack Deven, gag him and lock him in his car. The car is pushed into a river, causing a gagged Deven to die.

Twelve years later, his son Raj, now a 22-year-old boy goes to college where he falls in love with Priya, a rich girl. Raj also works as a part-time mechanic at a garage owned by Kartar Singh. One day, he discovers his father's older car Taarzan. He pools money and buys it at 5000 rupees.

Raj works with Kartar Singh to repair and upgrade the car in memory of his father. They revamp the car into a more advanced version than Deven's original design, and Raj decides to rename it DC to honor his father's memory.

Deven's spirit possesses the car and controls it to seek revenge on his murderers. When Rakesh is abroad, Deven's spirit uses the car to kill his cronies Kailash, Anthony, Mahesh and the police inspector Sanjay. Since the car belongs to Raj, he becomes a suspect in the eyes of Inspector Khurana, the investigating officer. When Rakesh returns to India and learns all his partners have died.

Rakesh is revealed to be Priya's father and meets Raj on her insistence. After knowing Raj is Deven's son, Rakesh assumes that Raj has found the truth and is using Priya as a pawn. He decides to kill Raj and take Priya back with him to London and get Priya married to a man of his choice. Raj is shocked as Rakesh tells him the truth about Deven's death. Before Rakesh could kill Raj, Deven's spirit appears and saves Raj. Terrified, Rakesh confesses his crime before everyone.

Inspector Khurana arrests Rakesh. Deven says his last goodbye to Suhasini and Raj. With Raj, Suhasini and Priya united, Deven's spirit becomes free, and he ascends to heaven. Raj and Priya live a happy life afterwards.

Cast 
Vatsal Sheth as Raj Choudhary, Deven's son and Priya's boyfriend
Ayesha Takia as Priya Kapoor, Raj's girlfriend and Rakesh's daughter
Ajay Devgn as Deven Choudhary, Raj's father
Farida Jalal as Mrs. Suhasini Choudhary, Deven's mother and Raj's grandmother
Pankaj Dheer as Rakesh Kapoor, Deven's enemy and Priya's father
Sumeet Pathak as Vikram "Vicky" Jain, Raj's best friend
Amrish Puri as Kartar "Kaakha" Singh / Paaji, Raj's boss
Sadashiv Amrapurkar as Anthony D'Costa, Jojo's father
Shakti Kapoor as Mahesh Saxena
Mukesh Tiwari as Kailash Chopra
Sheela Sharma as Mrs. Priya Chopra, Kailash's wife
Gulshan Grover as Inspector Khurana
Rajpal Yadav as Constable Sitaram Agashe
Deepak Shirke as Inspector Sanjay Sharma
Jeetu Verma as Jojo D'Costa
Sikandar Kharbanda as Rocky Bedi 
Narendra Bedi as Truck Driver
Amrit Patel as Scrapeyard Junk Owner
Sharad Sankla as Constable

Soundtrack

The music is composed by Himesh Reshammiya with lyrics by Sameer.

Critical response
Taran Adarsh of IndiaFM gave the film 2.5 stars out of 5, writing ″On the whole, TAARZAN THE WONDER CAR is a different experience that will find its share of supporters and adversaries. At the box-office, the film will have to rely on kid-power to make it big. Had the film released during vacations, the outcome would've been much better. Dhawan G of Rediff.com wrote ″The Abbas-Mustan film will actually delight kids more than adults. It's funny, Hollywood's king of horror Stephen King would never have seen his horror fest Christine becoming a family film, where the car—instead of scaring the audience—entertains them.″ Goher Iqbal Punn of BBC.com wrote ″On the whole, Tarzan - The Wonder Car is a stylishly and creatively executed enterprise, which will have you glued to your seat till the end. A great entertainer overall.″

References

External links
 

2004 films
2000s Hindi-language films
Films directed by Abbas–Mustan
Films scored by Himesh Reshammiya
2010s fantasy action films
Indian action thriller films
Indian fantasy action films
Indian films about revenge
Films about automobiles
2004 action thriller films